Vejar is a settlement north of Trebnje in eastern Slovenia. Historically the area was part of Lower Carniola and the entire Municipality of Trebnje is now included in the Southeast Slovenia Statistical Region.

History
Vejar became a separate settlement in 2014, when it was administratively separated from Hudeje. It is a Roma settlement. As a hamlet of Hudeje, it was previously known as V blatih.

References

External links
Hudeje at Geopedia (with Vejar southwest of the village center)

Populated places in the Municipality of Trebnje
Populated places established in 2014